Håkon Ingvald Bleken (born 9 January 1929 in Trondheim) is a Norwegian painter and graphic artist.

Education and work as an artist 
Bleken started his art education at Trondheim art school, where he studied under Karsten Keiseraas and Oddvar Alstad from 1948 to 1949. He then studied at the Norwegian National Academy of Fine Arts in Oslo under professor Jean Heiberg from 1949 to 1952. In 1950, he participated in the etching class at the Norwegian National Academy of Craft and Art Industry under Chrix Dahl. From 1953 to 1954 he was a student at Statens Sløyd- og Tegnelærerskole in Notodden.

Bleken worked as a senior scientific officer at the Institute of Form and Colour Studies at the Norwegian Institute of Technology from 1960 to 1972.

Regarding Bleken's productions 
A series of coal sketches called Fragmenter av et diktatur (Fragments of a dictatorship) from 1971 was his definitive breakthrough as an artist. Bleken is known for basing his paintings on literary works; Doctor Faustus by Thomas Mann, Hedda Gabler by Henrik Ibsen and The Trial by Franz Kafka are all works that are often seen in his production. Human suffering and social activism are themes often depicted in Bleken's works.

Bleken has painted several well-known people, among them Olav V of Norway and Arne Nordheim.

Bleken is also known as an illustrator of literary works. He has illustrated such works as Hedda Gabler by Henrik Ibsen, Haugtussa by Arne Garborg, Mysteries by Knut Hamsun, Babette's Feast by Karen Blixen and Dalen Portland by Kjartan Fløgstad.

Exhibitions and embellishments (a selection) 
As one of Norway's most prominent contemporary artists he has had a series of separate exhibitions in the country's biggest galleries, among them the National Museum of Norway and the Henie-Onstad Art Centre, since his debut in 1951. His works have also been bought for several art collections in Norway, among them those of the National Museum of Norway, Norsk Hydro and Statoil.

Bleken has contributed to the embellishment of buildings such as St. Olav Cathedral, E. C. Dahls Brewery, Tyholttårnet and Olavshallen in Trondheim, the local church in Spjelkavik, Oslo Concert Hall, Oslo Central Station and the Norwegian Parliament Building, all in Norway.

Theft 
In December 2010, thieves broke into Bleken's storage room and stole nine of his paintings, seven of which were cut out of their frames in such a manner that they were badly damaged. The paintings, which included a portrait of Arne Nordheim and one self-portrait, were all made by Bleken himself, with the exception of the painting Hjortedansøsen by the Norwegian painter Arthur Alstad. The paintings have an estimated collective value of 2,000,000 NOK, of which Hjortedansøsen alone has an estimated value of 250,000 NOK. The paintings were retrieved by the police on December 28, when they were found rolled up in a small storage room in Heimdal.

Awards 
In 1990, Bleken was awarded Knight, First Class of the Royal Norwegian Order of St. Olav. On 4 September 2009 the Norwegian Royal Court announced that Harald V of Norway has promoted Bleken to Commander of the same order "for his work as an artist". In 2005 he was awarded Anders Jahre's culture prize. The regional newspaper Adresseavisen pronounced Bleken "Trønder of the year" in 2003. He has also been awarded several other minor culture prizes.

Literature 
 Wangen, Stein Slettebakk: «Håkon Bleken. Fragmenter». Kom Publishing, 2003.

References

External links 
  (Norwegian)
 An online exhibition of some of Håkon Bleken's works

1929 births
Living people
20th-century Norwegian painters
Norwegian male painters
21st-century Norwegian painters
People from Trondheim
20th-century Norwegian male artists
21st-century Norwegian male artists